Deep Waters may refer to:
"Deep Waters" (short story),  a 1910 short story by P.G. Wodehouse
Deep Waters (book) a 1967 collection of stories by William Hope Hodgson
Deep Waters (1948 film), a 1948 drama
Deep Waters (1920 film), a lost 1920 American drama silent film
"Deep Waters," a song by Dirty Three from their 1998 album Ocean Songs